Barrytown may refer to:

Places

New Zealand 

 Barrytown – West Coast town on the South Island
 Barrytown Flats – coastal plain near Barrytown

United States 

 Barrytown, Alabama
 Barrytown, New York

Other uses 

 The Barrytown Trilogy –  also known as The Barrytown Pentalogy by Roddy Doyle

 Barrytown – song by Steely Dan on their Pretzel Logic album